Raymond Wong Pak-ming  (Chinese: 黃百鳴, born 8 April 1946; sometimes transliterated as Raymond Wong Bak-ming) is a Hong Kong film producer, playwright, director and actor. He is one of the most successful producers in Hong Kong cinema, having been one of the comedians to establish Cinema City Studios in 1980.

Career

Cinema City
In 1980, Wong formed the renowned Cinema City Co., Ltd. with Karl Maka and Dean Shek. The production company became an industry phenomenon, producing films such as A Better Tomorrow, Aces Go Places, Prison on Fire and All About Ah-Long. Actors such as Chow Yun-fat, Leslie Cheung and Ti Lung along with filmmakers John Woo, Ringo Lam and Tsui Hark were some of the people who rose to fame under the Cinema City label. He played the actor in the comedy ghost series Happy Ghost (開心鬼).

In 1991, the trio broke up, with both Maka and Shek ending their interests in the film industry.

Mandarin films
Wong eventually formed Mandarin Films Distribution Co. Ltd. later that year, while continuing to establish himself as a successful film producer. Mandarin went on to produce films such as The Bride with White Hair, Dragon Tiger Gate, and Flash Point, with Wong often serving as an executive producer for the films produced. To this day, the company has produced over 100 films.

Personal life
Wong is married to Wong Man-kuen.

Filmography as actor

 Fun, Hong Kong Style (1974)
 For Whom to Be Murdered (1978) – Liu Man (Journalist)
 Strike of the Thunderkick Tiger (1978)
 Laughing Times (滑稽時代) (1981) – Man Eating Bananas
 Beware of Pickpocket (1981) – Dishonest Diner
 All the Wrong Clues (鬼馬智多星)  (1981)
 Till Death Do We Scare (1982) – Stewart Pik
 Aces Go Places (最佳拍檔) (1982) – Priest
 Aces Go Places 2 (最佳拍檔大顯神通) (1983) – Priest
 Play Catch (1983)
 Kung Hai Fat Choy (1984)
 Happy Ghost (開心鬼) (1984) – Stewart Pik, the Happy Ghost
 The Tenant (靈氣迫人) (1984) – Hansom Wong
 Happy Ghost II (開心鬼放暑假) (1985) – Hong Sam-Kwai/Happy Ghost
 Cong & Me in Paradise (1985) – Cannon Wong
 True Colours (1986) – Robert
 Happy Ghost 3 (開心鬼撞鬼) (1986) – Hong Sam-Kwai/Happy Ghost
 Seven Years Itch (1987) – Willie Ng
 Goodbye Darling (呷醋大丈夫) (1987) – Dai Luk Mao
 The Eighth Happiness (八星報喜) (1988) – Mr. Fong
 All About Ah-Long (阿郎的故事) (1989) – Patrick
 How to be a Billionaire (1989) – Huang Shang
 Mr. Coconut (合家歡) (1989) – Wong Ka-Fan
 "Celebrity Talk Show" (1989) TV Series – Guest
 Happy Ghost IV (開心鬼救開心鬼) (1989) – Hong Sam-Kwai/Happy Ghost
 Sisters of the World Unite (1991)
 Great Pretenders (千王) (1991)
 The Banquet aka. Party of a Wealthy Family (豪門夜宴) (1991) – Forty
 Happy Ghost V (開心鬼5上錯身) (1991) – The Happy Ghost/Dog named Magic as a Human Being
 Daddy, Father and Papa (1991)
 All's Well, Ends Well (家有囍事) (1992) – Shang Moon
 Perfect Couples (1993)
 Insanity (1993) – John Wong
 All's Well, Ends Well Too (花田喜事) (1993) – Lam Ka-sing
 Laughter of the Water Margins (1993)
 It's a Wonderful Life (大富之家) (1994) – Kow-Foo Yum
 I Have a Date with Spring (我和春天有個約會) (1994) – Maitre d'
 Tristar (大三元) (1996) – Supt. Mai
 A Chinese Ghost Story: The Tsui Hark Animation (小倩) (1997) (voice: Cantonese version) – White Cloud
 All's Well, Ends Well 1997 (97家有囍事) (1997) – Lo Leung
 Troublesome Night 4 (陰陽路4之與鬼同行) (1998) – Mr. Wong
 Ninth Happiness (1998)
 The Mirror() (1999) – The Ghost
 Fascination Amour (1999)
 Winner Takes All (2000)
 Wonder Women (2007)
 Dancing Lion (醒獅) (2007)
 Happy Funeral (2008)
 All's Well, Ends Well 2009 (家有囍事2009) (2009) – L
 All's Well, Ends Well 2010 (花田囍事2010) (2010)
 All's Well, Ends Well 2011 (最強囍事) (2011)
 Magic to Win (開心魔法) (2011)
 All's Well, Ends Well 2012 (八星抱喜) (2012)
 Love Is... Pyjamas (2012)
 Hotel Deluxe (百星酒店) (2013)
 Hello Babies (六福喜事) (2014)
 Golden Chicken 3 (金雞SSS) (2014)
 Kung Fu Angels (青春鬥) (2014)
 An Inspector Calls (浮華宴) (2015)

References

External links
 
 HK cinemagic entry

1946 births
Living people
People from Heshan
20th-century Hong Kong male actors
21st-century Hong Kong male actors
Hong Kong film producers
Hong Kong screenwriters
Hong Kong film directors
Hong Kong male film actors
Hong Kong male comedians
Hong Kong pro-Beijing politicians
Members of the Election Committee of Hong Kong, 2012–2017
Members of the Election Committee of Hong Kong, 2017–2021
Members of the Election Committee of Hong Kong, 2021–2026